Florent Perradin (born 11 May 1992) is a French professional footballer who plays for Mâcon as a defender.

Club career
On 16 June 2021, after 11 years with Bourg-Péronnas, Perradin left the club to join lower-league side Mâcon.

Career statistics

References

External links
 

1992 births
Living people
Footballers from Lyon
French footballers
Association football defenders
Football Bourg-en-Bresse Péronnas 01 players
UF Mâconnais players
Ligue 2 players
Championnat National players
Championnat National 2 players